
Year 534 (DXXXIV) was a common year starting on Sunday (link will display the full calendar) of the Julian calendar. At the time, it was known as the Year of the Consulship of Iustinianus and Paulinus (or, less frequently, year 1287 Ab urbe condita). The denomination 534 for this year has been used since the early medieval period, when the Anno Domini calendar era became the prevalent method in Europe for naming years.

Events 
 By place 

 Byzantine Empire 
 January 1 – Decimus Theodorius Paulinus is appointed consul (the last to hold this office in the West).
 March – King Gelimer surrenders to Belisarius, after spending a winter in the mountains of Numidia. He and large numbers of captured Vandals are transported to Constantinople. The Vandal Kingdom ends, and the African provinces return to the Byzantine Empire.
 April – Belisarius leaves a small force in Africa under the Byzantine general Solomon, to continue the subjugation of the province. He is appointed governor (Exarch) and pacifies the Moorish tribes with success. Malta becomes a Byzantine province (until 870).
 Summer – Belisarius arrives in Constantinople and is permitted by Emperor Justinian I to celebrate a triumph, the first non-imperial triumph for over 500 years. In the procession the spoils of the Temple of Jerusalem and the Vandal treasure are paraded.
 Justinian I commemorates the victory against the Vandals by stamping medals in his honor with the inscription "Gloria Romanorum" (approximate date).
 November 16 – A second and final revision of the Codex Justinianus is published.

 Europe 
 Toledo becomes the capital of the Visigothic Kingdom that controls the Iberian Peninsula. King Theudis expands Visigoth rule in the southern regions (Hispania Baetica).
 The Frankish kings Childebert I and Chlothar I overthrow Godomar, king of the Burgundians, and end the Kingdom of Burgundy.
 Cynric becomes king of Wessex (according to the Anglo-Saxon Chronicle).
 October 2 – King Athalaric dies of tuberculosis, age 18, having dissipated his youth in drink and debauchery. His mother, Amalasuntha, proposes to her cousin Theodahad, the kingdom's largest landowner and her father's last male heir, that he share the throne with her but that he will be king of the Ostrogoths in name only. Theodahad has secret conversations with the Byzantine ambassador, and promises to turn over Tuscany in exchange for a large sum of money, the rank of senator, and permission to live at Constantinople.

Births 
 Leander, bishop of Seville (approximate date)
 Liu Jingyan, empress of the Chen Dynasty (d. 616)
 Ming Di, emperor of the Northern Zhou (d. 560)
 Taliesin, Welsh poet (approximate date)

Deaths 
 October 2 – Athalaric, king of the Ostrogoths
 Anthemius of Tralles, architect and mathematician (approximate date)
 Cerdic, first king of Wessex
 Godomar, king of Burgundy
 Marcellinus Comes, Latin chronicler (approximate date)
 Theuderic I, king of Austrasia (or 533)

References